Rhenium(VI) chloride is the inorganic compound with the formula ReCl6.  It is a black paramagnetic solid. The molecules adopt an octahedral structure as seen in tungsten(VI) chloride.

Preparation and reactions
Rhenium(VI) chloride was first generated as a mixture by chlorination of Re films. Bulk samples can be prepared by combining rhenium hexafluoride with excess boron trichloride:
2 ReF6  +  6 BCl3  →   ReCl6  +  6 BF2Cl

It is unstable at room temperature with respect to rhenium(V) chloride:
2 ReCl6  →   [ReCl5]2  +  Cl2

References

Rhenium compounds
Chlorides
Metal halides